Rushinovo is the name of several rural localities in Russia:
Rushinovo, Novgorod Oblast, a village in Novoselitskoye Settlement of Novgorodsky District of Novgorod Oblast
Rushinovo, Yaroslavl Oblast, a village in Perelessky Rural Okrug of Pereslavsky District of Yaroslavl Oblast